Bonakabad (also Romanized as Bonakābād and Bonkābād) is a village in Heshmatabad Rural District, in the Central District of Dorud County, Lorestan Province, Iran. At the 2006 census, its population was 999, in 217 families.

References 

Towns and villages in Dorud County